Computer Associates Panvalet (also known as CA-Panvalet) is a revision control and source code management system for mainframe computers such as the IBM System z and IBM System/370 running the z/OS and z/VSE operating systems.

CA-PAN/LCM is a similar product for PCs.

Overview
Panvalet uses a client-server model where users check-out files to change and check them back into the repository when finished. It can be used to manage program source code, JCL, Macros/commands for utilities such as Easytrieve and object module files. 

It supports granular access controls including check-in and check-out by specific mainframe user IDs.

History
Panvalet was developed by Pansophic Systems in 1969 as a program to store and manage computer program source code on direct-access storage devices. Before Panvalet code was saved as paper punch cards, typically with 500 to 3,000 cards per program, often 1,000,000 or more per data center. Cards were bulky, difficult to store and transport, difficult and costly to back up, and prone to catastrophic errors since one misplaced card could prevent a program from running correctly.

Pansophic began selling the program in 1970 at a price of $2,880 per copy. It was immediately successful.

In 1978, it was reported that Panvalet, at the time a product of Pansophic Systems, Inc, was in use at over 3,000 sites.

Earnings reports for Pansophic were tracked by The New York Times.

Computer Associates acquired Panvalet in 1991 when it purchased Pansophic Systems for $390M. Broadcom acquired Panvalet in 2018 when it purchased Computer Associates.

See also
 CA Technologies

References

External links
 

Configuration management
Proprietary version control systems
IBM mainframe software